The men's team pursuit event was part of the track cycling programme at the 1920 Summer Olympics.

Results

Quarterfinals

Quarterfinal 1

Quarterfinal 2

Quarterfinal 3

Quarterfinal 4

Semifinals

Semifinal 1

Semifinal 2

Final

Italy took first place after a protest of the results of the final.  No third place match was held between South Africa and Belgium; instead, their times in the semifinals were used to determine final placings.

References

External links
 
 

Men's team pursuit
Track cycling at the 1920 Summer Olympics
Cycling at the Summer Olympics – Men's team pursuit